The NEC V25 (μPD70320) is the microcontroller version of the NEC V20 processor, manufactured by NEC Corporation. Features include:

 NEC V20 core: 8-bit external data path, 20-bit address bus, machine code compatible with the Intel 8088
 Timers
 Internal interrupt controller
 Dual-channel UART and baud rate generator for serial communications

It was officially phased out by NEC in early 2003.

References

Microcontrollers
V25
16-bit microprocessors